Bill Beach (born 1953) is a jazz pianist, vocalist, and teacher.

Biography
Beach began his study of the piano at age seven. His mother was a piano teacher, his grandfather a choir director, and his grandmother a church organist. At age 11, he was listening to records by Oscar Peterson, Sonny Rollins and Gil Evans that belonged to his older brother. An early piano teacher introduced him to the transcriptions of Dave Brubeck and he was influenced by Bill Evans and McCoy Tyner. He studied music at Portland State University, Oregon State University, and Mt. Hood Community College. During the 1970s he studied privately with Marian McPartland, Warren Bernhardt, Jerome Gray, and Mary Fields. In 1974 he joined the group of jazz guitarist Jimmy James and worked with him for much of the decade.

In the early 1980s, Beach spent seven months in the European jazz scene. He lived in Amsterdam and performed in clubs such as the Bamboo Bar and Jazz Café Alto as leader of his own trio. In 1984 he returned to the United States, worked regularly with drummer Ron Steen, and performed in groups with Joe Henderson, Bobby Hutcherson, Eddie Harris, Howard Roberts, and Nick Brignola.

In the 1990s, he settled in Portland, Oregon, and led a trio which included Mark Murphy. He also performed with Charlie Rouse, Nat Adderley, Bud Shank, and Jimmy Cobb. In 1997 he toured Japan with his trio and in 2001 toured European ports.

In 2003, Beach began to study Brazilian music and the Portuguese language. He concentrated on the bossa nova introduced by Antonio Carlos Jobim, João Gilberto, Vinicius De Moraes, Carlos Lyra and João Donato and the later MPB styles of Sergio Mendez, Edu Lobo, Milton Nascimento, and Ivan Lins. He released Letting Go in 2004 on his Axial Records label. This album was his debut as leader of a recording session and featured Beach singing Brazilian standards and playing original instrumentals in a piano trio setting.

In 2008, Beach began writing lyrics in the Brazilian style, and his album Brasil Beat (2010) contained music and lyrics in Portuguese. This was followed by Búzios also original material and also on Axial Records. This album featured Rebecca Kilgore on vocals and Gary Hobbs on drums.

Discography
 Letting Go (2004)
 Brasil Beat (2010)
 Búzios (2011)

References

External links
 

Living people
1953 births
21st-century American pianists
American jazz songwriters
American male singers
American male songwriters
Bossa nova pianists
Bossa nova singers
American male pianists
Musicians from Corvallis, Oregon
Musicians from Portland, Oregon
Portuguese-language singers
Singers from Oregon
Songwriters from Oregon
21st-century American male musicians
American male jazz musicians